William Giles Evans (born 28 January 1997 in Norwich, England) is an English rugby union openside flanker who plays for Harlequins in Premiership Rugby.  He previously played for Leicester Tigers, he made his Tigers debut against Gloucester having graduated from the academy.

Career 

Evans made his Tigers debut on 2 April 2016 against Gloucester at Welford Road; at the age of 19 years and 64 days old he became the second youngest forward to play for Leicester in the Premiership.  

He was selected for England Under 20s in the 2016 World Rugby Under 20 Championship which England won and was named in tournament's "Dream Team". He was also the only Under 20s player to make the Sky Sports 28/06/16 Team of the Week. 

Evans received his first call up to the senior England squad by coach Eddie Jones on 1 August 2016 for a pre-season training squad.

On his 20th birthday, he scored a try in the 27–20 win over Northampton Saints in which Tigers qualified for the semifinals of the 2016-17 Anglo-Welsh Cup. however he injured himself in the process and didn't return until 9 April, when he played for the A-side against Worcester. 

Evans was selected for the  U20s team for 2017 World Rugby Under 20 Championship.

Evans went on to win the Gallagher Premiership in 2021 with Harlequins. Despite missing the end of the season due to injury he was one of the standout players.

References

1997 births
Living people
English rugby union players
Harlequin F.C. players
Leicester Tigers players
Rugby union flankers
Rugby union players from Norwich